Tony Cornect is a Canadian politician from Newfoundland and Labrador, who represented the district of Port au Port in the Newfoundland and Labrador House of Assembly from 2007 to 2015. He was a member of the Progressive Conservative Party, and served in the provincial cabinet as Minister of Tourism, Culture and Recreation and Minister of Service NL. He was defeated in the 2015 provincial election, in which he ran in the new district of Stephenville-Port au Port. 

Cornect previously served as a town councillor and mayor in Cape St. George. He was also formerly a board member of Le Gaboteur, the province's only French-language newspaper. A fluently bilingual Franco-Newfoundlander, Cornect was the first MHA in the province ever to take his oath of office in French.

Electoral record

|-

|-

|-

|}

|-

|-

|}

|-

|-

|}

{| class="wikitable"
|- style="background-color:#E9E9E9"
! colspan="6"|By-election, February 8, 2007resignation of Jim Hodder
|- style="background-color:#E9E9E9"
! colspan="2" style="width: 200px"|Party
! style="width: 170px"|Candidate
! style="width: 40px"|Votes
! style="width: 40px"|%
! style="width: 40px"|+/-

| style="width: 185px"| Progressive Conservative
|Tony Cornect
|align=right|2,701
|align=right|62.0
|align=right|
|-

|-

| style="width: 185px"|New Democrat
|Paul O'Keefe
|align=right|135
|align=right|3.1
|align=right|

References

External links
 Tony Cornect's PC Party biography

Progressive Conservative Party of Newfoundland and Labrador MHAs
Mayors of places in Newfoundland and Labrador
Living people
Franco-Newfoundlander people
Members of the Executive Council of Newfoundland and Labrador
21st-century Canadian politicians
Year of birth missing (living people)